Frederick W. Stavely (1894-1976) was a chemical research scientist who discovered polyisoprene.

Career
In 1950, Stavely served as chairman of the American Chemical Society Rubber Division.

In 1953, Stavely was  working at the Firestone Tire & Rubber Company when he discovered polyisoprene. At the time he was investigating the reaction of butyl lithium on butadiene and discovered that polymerization of isoprene with metallic lithium produced polyisoprene (dubbed coral rubber because of its appearance) with a high cis content.
High cis content is associated with enhanced strain crystallization, important during World War II because other synthetics did not exhibit the crystallization effect.

In 1972, Stavely received the Charles Goodyear Medal in recognition of this discovery.

References

Polymer scientists and engineers
1894 births
1976 deaths
U.S. Synthetic Rubber Program
Tire industry people
Bridgestone people